Fiondella Field is a baseball venue located on the campus of the University of Hartford in West Hartford, Connecticut, United States.  It is home to the Hartford Hawks baseball team, a member of the NCAA Division I America East Conference.  The stadium hosted its first game on March 29, 2006.  It holds a capacity of 1,000 spectators and includes dugouts, batting cages, and a modern scoreboard over the left field fence.

History
Prior to the field's construction, Hartford's baseball program played at several venues in central Connecticut following its move off campus in the mid 1980s. These venues included New Britain's Beehive Field, Bristol's Muzzy Field, East Hartford's Ray McKenna Field, and Simsbury's Memorial Field. 

Ground was broken on the venue in April 2005.  The venue opened on March 29, 2006, and Hartford's first game there was against Massachusetts.  Hartford won the game, 6–2.

Renaming
Through the 2009 season, the field was known as the Hartford Baseball Field.  In a ceremony on October 4, 2009, the venue was renamed Fiondella Field, in honor of the Fiondella family, primarily businessman Robert Fiondella, because of his involvement in the Hartford community.

High school baseball
The West Hartford amateur baseball association sponsors the annual mayor's cup baseball game at Fiondella Field. It is the final game of season between rivals Conard High School and Hall High School.

See also
 List of NCAA Division I baseball venues

References

External links
 Fiondella Field

University of Hartford
Hartford Hawks sports venues
Hartford Hawks baseball
College baseball venues in the United States
High school baseball venues in the United States
Baseball venues in Connecticut
Sports venues in Hartford County, Connecticut